Andrej Štimac (born March 31, 1979) is a Croatian professional basketball coach and former player who is the current head coach of Donar. During his playing career, he played as power forward and center.

Playing career 
Štimac started his professional career with KK Kvarner of the Croatian HT Premijer liga in 2001. Next, he spent three seasons with Cibona, also playing a total of 44 games in the EuroLeague where he averaged 4.7 points and 2.3 rebounds per game. In 2005, he played for Menorca Bàsquet in Spain.

From 2012 to 2016, he played in Switzerland for Lions de Genève (2012–2015) and Lugano Tigers (2015–2016). Štimac finished his career with a last season at his first club, Kvarner 2010.

Coaching career 
Štimac began his coaching career in 2017, as an assistant for Fribourg Olympic in Switzerland, serving under Petar Aleksić. He left Fribourg in 2020, he became the head coach of Lions de Genève and helped them win the Swiss Cup and SBL Cup in 2021. His contract was not renewed after the 2021–22 season after the Lions were eliminated in the semi-finals by Fribourg.

In the summer of 2022, Štimac signed a one-year contract to become assistant coach for the Dutch club Donar of the BNXT League, where he was an assistant under Matthew Otten. After Otten was fired after a disappointing start of the season, Stimac signed a contract as head coach until 2023–24 on October 31.

References 

Donar (basketball club) coaches
1979 births

Living people
Croatian men's basketball players
Croatian basketball coaches
Lions de Genève players
KK Kvarner 2010 players
KK Cibona players
Menorca Bàsquet players
KK Zadar players
Turów Zgorzelec players
KK Zagreb players
Mersin Büyükşehir Belediyesi S.K. players
Lugano Tigers players